The Austerlitz was a first-rate 118-gun ship of the line of the French Navy, of the Océan type, designed by Jacques-Noël Sané.

Ordered on 19 December 1805 to reinforce the Navy after the disaster of Trafalgar, she was commissioned in Toulon in May 1809 under Captain Guien.  On 29 August 1814, after the Hundred Days, she was transferred from Toulon to Brest, along with Wagram and Commerce de Paris, where she was disarmed in December.
Austerlitz was eventually struck and broken up in 1837.

References
Roche, Jean-Michel (2005). Dictionnaire des bâtiments de la Flotte de guerre française de Colbert à nos jours. Tome I (1671-1870)

Ships of the line of the French Navy
Océan-class ships of the line
1808 ships
Ships built in France